Daniel Ermindo Lanata (born 25 June  1966) is an Argentine football manager.

References

External links

1962 births
Living people
People from Casilda
Argentine football managers
Monagas S.C. managers
Deportivo Anzoátegui managers
Estrella Roja F.C. managers
Club Tacuary managers
Argentine expatriate football managers
Argentine expatriate sportspeople in Venezuela
Argentine expatriate sportspeople in Paraguay
Argentine expatriate sportspeople in Bolivia
Expatriate football managers in Venezuela
Expatriate football managers in Paraguay
Expatriate football managers in Bolivia
Sportspeople from Santa Fe Province
12 de Octubre Football Club managers
Sportivo Luqueño managers
Estudiantes de Caracas S.C. managers